Girl's Mind is the first greatest hits album by Swedish girl group Play, before the band confirmed that they would split up for an indefinite break five months after this release in an official statement in September 2005.

Content
"Girl's Mind" consists of ten, three single releases and seven of the group's best known album songs, previously released on their three first studio albums, excluding the content of their holiday studio album "Play Around the Christmas Tree". The first three songs are from their debut album "Us Against the World", six songs from their second studio album "Replay" and finally the song "Another Love Story" from their third studio album "Don't Stop the Music". The album features the three single releases "I'm Gonna Make You Love Me" featuring guest vocals of Chris Trousdale, the hit "Us Against the World" and "I Must Not Chase the Boys". Although being released in 2005, when replacement Janet Leon was part of the group, the album cover features a picture of the original line-up. "Girl's Mind" is the final Play major release, before the band confirmed that they would split up for an indefinite break five months after this release in an official statement in September 2005. In 2006, "Another Love Story" was featured in Dead or Alive Xtreme 2, for the Xbox 360.

Track listing
"Us Against the World" – 3:42
"I'm Gonna Make You Love Me" (feat. Chris Trousdale) – 3:06
"Hopelessly Devoted" –3:22
"Let's Get to the Love Part" – 3:30
"Girl's Mind" – 2:25
"I Must Not Chase the Boys" – 3:16
"Hot" – 3:45
"What Is Love?" – 3:44
"Another Love Story" – 3:10
"Ain't No Mountain High Enough" – 3:14

Personnel
Anaïs Lameche – lead vocals
Rosie Munter – backing vocals
Anna Sundstrand – backing vocals
Janet Leon – lead vocals

Play (Swedish group) albums
2005 compilation albums